The 1956 Baltimore Orioles season involved the Orioles finishing 6th in the American League with a record of 69 wins and 85 losses.

Offseason 
 October 10, 1955: Ed Lopat was released by the Orioles.

Regular season 
 September 20, 1956: Catcher Tom Gastall was killed in a plane crash.
 September 30, 1956: Joe Frazier hit a home run in the last at bat of his career.

Season standings

Record vs. opponents

Notable transactions 
 May 14, 1956: Billy Loes was purchased by the Orioles from the Brooklyn Dodgers for $20,000.
 May 21, 1956: Dave Philley and Jim Wilson were traded by the Orioles to the Chicago White Sox for Mike Fornieles, Connie Johnson, George Kell and Bob Nieman.
 July 13, 1956: Morrie Martin was selected off waivers by the Orioles from the Chicago White Sox.
 August 17, 1956: Hal Smith was traded by the Orioles to the Kansas City Athletics for Joe Ginsberg.

Roster

Player stats

Batting

Starters by position 
Note: Pos = Position; G = Games played; AB = At bats; H = Hits; Avg. = Batting average; HR = Home runs; RBI = Runs batted in

Other batters 
Note: G = Games played; AB = At bats; H = Hits; Avg. = Batting average; HR = Home runs; RBI = Runs batted in

Pitching

Starting pitchers 
Note: G = Games pitched; IP = Innings pitched; W = Wins; L = Losses; ERA = Earned run average; SO = Strikeouts

Other pitchers 
Note: G = Games pitched; IP = Innings pitched; W = Wins; L = Losses; ERA = Earned run average; SO = Strikeouts

Relief pitchers 
Note: G = Games pitched; W = Wins; L = Losses; SV = Saves; ERA = Earned run average; SO = Strikeouts

Farm system 

Lubbock franchise transferred to Texas City and renamed, July 8, 1956

Notes

References 

1956 Baltimore Orioles team at Baseball-Reference
1956 Baltimore Orioles season at baseball-almanac.com

Baltimore Orioles seasons
Baltimore Orioles season
Baltimore Orio